The 2004 Vuelta a Burgos was the 26th edition of the Vuelta a Burgos road cycling stage race, which was held from 2 August to 5 August 2004. The race started and finished in Burgos. The race was won by Alejandro Valverde of the  team.

General classification

References

Vuelta a Burgos
2004 in road cycling
2004 in Spanish sport